Donald Stuart Gann (1932 – February 3, 2020) was an American trauma surgeon. He chaired surgical departments at Case Western Reserve University, Brown University, Johns Hopkins School of Medicine, and the University of Maryland School of Medicine.

Early life and education 
Gann was born in 1932 in Baltimore to educator Beatrice Gann and physician Mark Gann. He was raised on Eutaw Street in Baltimore and Catonsville, Maryland. Gann attended Baltimore Polytechnic Institute until leaving in 11th grade to attend college at the age of 16. He double majored in physics and philosophy at Dartmouth College, graduating with magna cum laude and Phi Beta Kappa honors in 1952. Gann completed a medical degree at Johns Hopkins School of Medicine in 1956. He conducted a residency in surgery at Johns Hopkins University and an assistant residency at MedStar Union Memorial Hospital. Gann trained under Vernon Benjamin Mountcastle in neurosurgery before shifting to endocrine surgery.

Career 
In 1967, Gann was the first chair of the biomedical engineering department at Case Western Reserve University. In 1970, he became a professor of biomedical engineering and associate professor of surgery. In 1974, Gann became a professor of emergency medicine and director of the division of emergency medicine. From 1979 to 1988, Gann was chair of the new department of surgery at Brown University and was the second surgeon in chief of Rhode Island Hospital. He led the division of surgical critical care at the University of Maryland Medical Center from 1992 to 2000. He held other positions at University of Maryland School of Medicine (UMMS) including section chief of trauma surgery and critical care, and endocrine surgery. He retired from UMMS in 2010.

Gann and physiologist Dan Darlington founded Shock Therapeutics Biotechnologies Inc. based on a patent for treating hemorrhagic shock.

Personal life 
Gann was a Quaker. He was married to nurse practitioner Gail Burgan. He had three sons and a daughter. He died on February 3, 2020, at his Brooklandville, Maryland, residence. Gann was 87.

Awards and honors 
Gann was a member of the American Association of Endocrine Surgeons, American College of Surgeons, Halsted Society, Endocrine Society, and the Southern Surgical Association.

References 

1932 births
2020 deaths
20th-century American physicians
21st-century American physicians
Physicians from Baltimore
American surgeons
People from Catonsville, Maryland
Dartmouth College alumni
Johns Hopkins School of Medicine alumni
Case Western Reserve University faculty
Baltimore Polytechnic Institute alumni
Brown University faculty
University of Maryland School of Medicine faculty
Endocrine surgery
Trauma surgery
American Quakers
Christians from Maryland
20th-century surgeons